The Parthenaise is a French cattle breed. It is named for the town of Parthenay in the département of Deux-Sèvres, in the Nouvelle-Aquitaine region of western France. It was formerly a triple-purpose breed, raised for milk, meat and draught work, but is now raised mainly for beef.

History 

The Parthenaise forms a part of the large population – sometimes called Poitevine or Vendéenne – of wheaten-coloured cattle which traditionally occupied the western part of France, from the Loire to the Gironde. It is closely related to the Maraîchine, the Nantaise and the extinct Marchoise and Berrichonne, all of which belong to the same group. The cattle were sometimes called Gâtinaises or Boeufs de Gâtine, so named for the Gâtine Vendéenne. At the end of their working lives, these oxen were often sent to the area of Cholet to be fattened for slaughter; these were known as Choletaises.

In the second half of the nineteenth century many vineyards were destroyed by phylloxera and uprooted; the land was turned to pasture. A number of dairy co-operatives were formed, and the Parthenaise was used to produce a type of butter marketed as "Charente-Poitou", which quickly became well-known. By the late nineteenth century there were some 1.1 million head.

A herd-book was established in 1893 or 1894. From that time the population began to decline. This was partly because of the mechanisation of agriculture, which reduced the need for draught cattle, and partly because of competition from specialised breeds which began to reach the area from other parts of France: the Maine-Anjou and later the Charolaise for beef, and the Normande and later the Friesian for milk. After the Second World War the Parthenaise was still well represented in the Vendée and the Gâtine, but was under threat, both from the difficulty of finding bulls that met the stringent regulations for registration for artificial insemination, and from reduction of herds by culling to eradicate bovine tuberculosis. By the 1960s it had become clear that the dual-purpose aim for the breed was no longer viable, and in 1971 the decision was taken to select for beef production only. Since that time the population has grown consistently: the number of breeding cows rose from 7 000 in 1990 to 33 000 in 2008. In 2014 the total breed population was reported at 43 187.

In 2000 it was decided that the criterion for distinguishing the modern Parthenaise from the more traditional Maraîchine – which also descends from the old Vendéenne grouping – would be the bulls used for reproduction: offspring of bulls born later than Joli-Coeur (born in 1974) would be considered Parthenaises, while offspring of older bulls, of which stocks of semen were still held, could be considered Maraîchines. A genetic study in 2004 found Joli-Coeur and all approved Parthenais bulls born after him to be homozygous for the mh double-muscling gene, while bulls used in Maraîchine breeding were heterozygous or homozygous recessive. The Maraîchine thus represents a traditional form of the Parthenaise.

The breed has been exported to the Belgium, Ireland, the Netherlands and the United Kingdom.

Characteristics 

The coat ranges in colour from light to dark wheaten, with grey rings round the muzzle and eyes. The skin is black, as are the mucosa, the hooves, the switch and the edges of the ears. The horns are lyre-shaped.

Use 

The Parthenise was traditionally a triple-purpose breed, reared for draught work, for milk and for meat. From 1971 selection was for beef only.

References

Cattle breeds originating in France
Cattle breeds